Schweich is a village in the commune of Beckerich, in western Luxembourg.  , the village has a population of 184.

Beckerich
Villages in Luxembourg